Louisiana–Pearl station (sometimes stylized as Louisiana•Pearl) is an light rail station in Denver, Colorado, United States. It is served by the E and H Lines, operated by the Regional Transportation District (RTD), and was opened on November 17, 2006. It primarily serves the Washington Park and Platt Park neighborhoods, and is located beneath street level adjacent to the west side of I-25. Louisiana–Pearl features a public art, kinetic sculpture entitled Stange Machine created by Ira Sherman and dedicated in 2006.

References

RTD light rail stations in Denver
Railway stations in the United States opened in 2006